Niels Gunnar Bagh (born 9 March 1961) is a Danish cricket umpire who serves on the ICC Associate and Affiliate International Umpires panel.  Bagh first officiated a match of note in 2001 when Staffordshire played the Worcestershire Cricket Board in a List A match in the Cheltenham & Gloucester Trophy.  Four years later, Bagh stood in his first first-class fixture, which was between the Netherlands and Scotland in the 2005 Intercontinental Cup.  From 2005 to 2010, Bagh has stood in 12 further Intercontinental Cup matches.

After standing his first List A match in 2001, he had to wait until the 2007 ICC World Cricket League Division Two to stand his next, as Uganda played the UAE.  In total, Bagh has stood as an umpire in 25 List A matches.  Some of these List A matches have had One Day International status.  Bagh first stood in an ODI in August 2008 when the Netherlands played Bermuda.  From 2008 to 2010, he has stood in 14 ODI's, the last of which to date involved Ireland and the Netherlands.

Bagh has also officiated in 5 Twenty20 Internationals, all of which came in the 2008 ICC World Twenty20 Qualifier in Belfast.  His first match saw Canada play the Netherlands and his final Twenty20 International standing as an umpire saw Bermuda play Canada.

See also
 List of One Day International cricket umpires
 List of Twenty20 International cricket umpires

References

1961 births
Living people
Danish One Day International cricket umpires
Danish Twenty20 International cricket umpires